GNz7q is a starburst galaxy with a candidate proto-supermassive black hole in the early Universe, at a redshift of 7.1899 ± 0.0005, estimated to have existed only 750  years after the Big Bang. It was discovered in the Great Observatories Origins Deep Survey-North (GOODS-North) field taken by the Hubble Space Telescope.

The discovery is "the first observation of a rapidly growing black hole in the early universe" and is thought to help explain the growth of supermassive black holes less than a billion years after the Big Bang.

See also
Direct collapse black hole, a process by which black holes may form less than a few hundred million years after the Big Bang
J0313–1806, the earliest known supermassive black hole as of 2021, formed a few hundred million years after the Big Bang

References

Sources

External links
Zoom Into GNz7q, video, European Space Agency

Supermassive black holes
Astronomical objects discovered in 2022
Starburst galaxies
Ursa Major (constellation)